Lupinus albicaulis is a species of lupine known by the common name sicklekeel lupine. It is native to the western United States from Washington to California, where it grows mostly in mountain habitat. It is a hairy, erect perennial herb often exceeding a meter in height. The flower is purple to yellowish or whitish in color and has a sickle-shaped keel. In Oregon, where the plant is native, it has been cultivated for several uses, including reforestation and revegetation of roadsides and other disturbed habitat.

References

External links
Jepson Manual Treatment
Photo gallery

albicaulis
Flora of California
Flora of Oregon
Flora of Washington (state)
Flora without expected TNC conservation status